This article presents statistics of Latvian Higher League in the 1953 season.

Overview
It was contested by 7 teams, and Sarkanais Metalurgs won the championship.

League standings

References
RSSSF

Latvian SSR Higher League
Football 
Latvia